Cooper Chemical Company has been in business since 1857. The roots of the company were planted in the Iron Bound section (Clifford and Van Buren Streets) of Newark, New Jersey, by Charles Cooper and Jacob Kleinhans. The company, originally called Charles Cooper & Co., developed chemicals, additives, paints, and other materials for industries in the United States and consumers. The main business office was located on Worth Street near Chatham Square in New York City.

Today Cooper Chemical Company is still in bulk specialty chemical manufacturing. The product line provides material to the United States government and pharmaceutical companies throughout the world.

References

External links
 Chas. Cooper & Company Website on Oldnewark.com
  history page

Chemical companies of the United States
Companies based in Morris County, New Jersey
American companies established in 1857
Chemical companies established in 1857
1857 establishments in New Jersey